Melanie Ann Shatner (born August 1, 1964) is an American actress.

Biography 
Shatner was born on August 1, 1964 in Los Angeles, California. She is the youngest daughter of actors William Shatner and Gloria Rand.

Shatner had the major role in the Subspecies film series as Becky Morgan, sister of the protagonist, Michelle Morgan.

She has been married to actor Joel Gretsch since September 5, 1999. They have two daughters: Kaya (born 2002), and Willow (born 2005).

Filmography

Film

TV / web

References

Further reading

External links 
 

1964 births
Living people
20th-century American actresses
21st-century American actresses
Actresses from Los Angeles
American film actresses
American television actresses
American people of Austrian-Jewish descent
American people of Canadian descent
American people of Hungarian-Jewish descent
American people of Polish-Jewish descent
Jewish American actresses
William Shatner